Allium textile (prairie onion or textile onion) is a common species of wild onion found in the central part of North America.

Description 

A. textile produces egg-shaped bulbs up to 2.5 cm long. There are no rhizomes. Scapes are round in cross-section, up to 40 cm tall. Flowers are bell-shaped or urn-shaped, about 6 mm in diameter; tepals white or pink with reddish-brown midribs; pollen and anthers yellow.

Taxonomy 

A. textile is placed within section Amerallium, subgenus Amerallium.

Distribution and habitat 

The native range of A. textile extends across the Great Plains states from Oklahoma to Montana and Minnesota, plus the Rocky Mountain and Great Basin states from northern New Mexico to Washington, plus the Canadian provinces of Alberta, Saskatchewan and Manitoba. There is also a report of an isolated population in Indiana. Allium textile grows on dry, sunlit locations at elevations of 300–2400 m.

References

Bibliography

External links
 

textile
Onions
Flora of the Northwestern United States
Flora of the United States
Flora of Western Canada
Flora of the Great Basin
Flora of the Great Plains (North America)
Flora of New Mexico
Flora of the Rocky Mountains
Taxa named by Aven Nelson